Fikret Emek (born 20 September 1963 in Emirdağ) is a retired soldier from the Special Forces Command (ÖKK); a special forces unit active in the Kurdish–Turkish conflict.

He was one of the first people detained in the Ergenekon investigation; an investigation into a supposed neonationalist organization that allegedly planned to overthrow the Turkish government. The investigation started when 27 grenades allegedly belonging to him were discovered following a then anonymous tip-off.

Biography 
Emek was born in Emirdağ. In 1985 he graduated from the Turkish Military Academy. Later he joined the ÖKK, and retired in 2005.

He lives close to his widowed mother in Eskişehir.

Ergenekon 
He is notable for possessing the most munitions of any person detained in the investigation; more than enough to flatten a twelve-floor reinforced concrete building. His mother was safekeeping the munitions which he allegedly he had seized from PKK militants while on duty. Also confiscated were numerous documents including classified military information, and black lists.

On 5 August 2013 Emek was sentenced to 41 years and four months.

Footnotes

References 

1963 births
Living people
People from Emirdağ
Turkish Army officers
Turkish Military Academy alumni
People convicted in the Ergenekon trials